Keith Jennings (born August 22, 1977) is a retired  Bermudian professional football player, who represented the Bermuda national football team on 6 occasions from 2006 to 2007.

Club career

Bermuda
Jennings began his professional club career with Bermudian club Vasco Mariners in 1998 and played until 1999. With Vasco, he won the Bermudian Premier Division in 1998 and Bermuda FA Cup in 1999.

India
He later moved to India and signed with FC Kochin. He became the first ever Bermudian footballer to play for an Indian club. He represented the team in the top tier National Football League between 1999 and 2001. With Kochin, he achieved fame in India and won various regional tournaments including Kerala State Football League and All India Central Revenue Cup but finished fourth, twice in the National Football League.

Back to Bermuda
After his arrival in Bermuda, he has appeared with North Village Community Club in the Bermudian Premier Division before joining the Bermuda Hogges in the USL Second Division in 2008. With North Village Community Club, he lifted the Bermudian Premier Division twice in 2002–03 and 2005–06 seasons alongside the Bermuda FA Cup four times in 2002–03, 2003–04, 2004–05 and 2005–06 seasons. With Bermuda Hogges, he appeared in 5 Caribbean Club Championship qualification matches.

His playing career ended after he ruptured his spleen and had to have a kidney removed after a collision while playing for Southampton Rangers in 2010.

After breaking retirement
At the age of 41, he has also represented North Village Community Club in 2018 and scored against Somerset Trojans in a 2-1 win match in the Premier Division clash at Bernard Park. He played only 3 games in the Bermudan Corona League 2017/18 season, scoring a total of 5 goals.

International career
He made his senior international debut for Bermuda in a CONCACAF Gold Cup qualification match against US Virgin Islands in September 2006, which ended up as Bermuda's 6-0 win.

Jennings earned a total of 6 caps, scoring 1 goal for his country. His final international match was a March 2007 friendly match against Canada, which ended up as a 3-0 loss for Bermuda.

Career statistics

International goals
Scores and results list Bermuda's goal tally first.

Managerial career
Jennings was appointed as head coach of Southampton Rangers in June 2010 on a two-year deal. He was suspended for three years in March 2012 for assaulting referee Stephen Allen during a match of Bermudian Premier Division at Southampton Oval on 26 February.
He returned to Rangers from the coaching staff at St George's in August 2015.

Honours
Clube Vasco da Gama Bermuda
Bermudian Premier Division: 1998
Bermuda FA Cup: 1999
Kochin
Kerala State Football League: 1999
All India Central Revenue Cup: 1999
North Village Rams
Bermudian Premier Division: 2002–03, 2005–06
Bermuda FA Cup: 2002–03, 2003–04, 2004–05, 2005–06

See also
 Bermuda international footballers

References

External links

1977 births
Living people
Association football midfielders
Bermudian footballers
Bermuda international footballers
North Village Rams players
FC Kochin players
Bermuda Hogges F.C. players
USL Second Division players
Bermudian expatriate footballers
Expatriate footballers in India
Bermudian football managers
National Football League (India) players